Edinburgh Leith was a burgh constituency of the House of Commons of the Parliament of the United Kingdom from 1950 to 1997. It elected one Member of Parliament (MP) by the first past the post system of election.

There was also an earlier Leith constituency, 1918 to 1950, and a yet earlier Leith Burghs constituency, 1832 to 1918.

Boundaries

1950 to 1955 

The constituency was first defined by the House of Commons (Redistribution of Seats) Act 1949, and first used in the 1950 general election, as one of seven constituencies covering the city of Edinburgh and the Midlothian burgh of Musselburgh. The other six constituencies were Edinburgh Central, Edinburgh East, Edinburgh North, Edinburgh Pentlands, Edinburgh South, and Edinburgh West, and the rest of the county of Midlothian was covered by the Midlothian and Peebles constituency, which also covered the county of Peebles.

The Edinburgh Leith constituency was entirely within the city, and covered the Central Leith, South Leith, and West Leith wards. Therefore, the area of the constituency was similar to that of the former burgh of Leith, as merged into the city in 1920.

1950 boundaries were used also for the 1951 general election.

1955 to 1983 

The results of the First Periodical Review of the Boundary Commission were implemented for the 1955 general election, and Edinburgh Leith was again one of seven constituencies covering the city of Edinburgh and the burgh of Musselburgh, all named as during the 1950 to 1955 period. The rest of the county of Midlothian was now covered, however, by the new Midlothian constituency.

The Edinburgh Leith constituency again covered wards named Central Leith, South Leith, and West Leith, but the overall boundary of the constituency was different.

For the county of Midlothian, inclusive of the city of Edinburgh, the general pattern established by the First Periodical Review was maintained for the general elections of 1959, 1964, 1966, 1970, February 1974, October 1974 and 1979. There were boundary adjustments, however, which became effective for the 1964 election and, as a result of the Second Periodical Review, for the February 1974 election.

Edinburgh Leith was not affected by the 1964 changes. For the February 1974 election, the constituency was designed to cover the Central Leith, South Leith, and West Leith wards and part of the Pilton ward of city.

1983 to 1997 

The results of the Third Periodical Review, which took account of the abolition of Scottish counties and burghs in 1975 and the creation of two-tier regions and districts and unitary islands council areas under the Local Government (Scotland) Act 1973, were implemented for the 1983 general election, and 1983 boundaries were used also in the general elections of 1987 and 1992.

Between 1983 and 1997 the electoral wards used to create Edinburgh Leith were 12–14, 17, and 18, and part of 23

As a result of the Fourth Periodical Review, Edinburgh Leith was abolished, and Edinburgh North and Leith was created for the 1997 general election.

Members of Parliament

Elections

Elections in the 1950s

Elections in the 1960s

Elections in the 1970s

Elections in the 1980s

Elections in the 1990s

See also 
 Politics of Edinburgh

Notes and references 

Historic parliamentary constituencies in Scotland (Westminster)
Constituencies of the Parliament of the United Kingdom established in 1950
Constituencies of the Parliament of the United Kingdom disestablished in 1997
Constituencies in Edinburgh
Leith